The 2018 Colonial Athletic Association men's basketball tournament was the postseason men's basketball tournament for the Colonial Athletic Association for  the 2017–18 NCAA Division I men's basketball season. The tournament was held March 3–6, 2018 at the North Charleston Coliseum in North Charleston, South Carolina. The College of Charleston received the CAA's automatic bid to the NCAA tournament with an 83–76 overtime win over Northeastern in the championship game.

Tournament changes 
On July 11, 2017, it was announced that the tournament, which was previously played on a Friday–Monday format, would move to a Saturday–Tuesday format beginning with the 2018 tournament. It was also announced that the semifinals and championship would be televised on CBS Sports Network through the 2021 tournament.

Seeds
All 10 CAA teams participated in the tournament. Teams were seeded by conference record, with a tiebreaker system used to seed teams with identical conference records. The top six teams received a bye to the quarterfinals.

Schedule

Bracket

* denotes overtime game

Game summaries

First round

Quarterfinals

Semifinals

Championship

Team and tournament leaders

Team leaders

See also
 2018 CAA women's basketball tournament

References

Colonial Athletic Association men's basketball tournament
Tournament
CAA men's basketball tournament
CAA men's basketball tournament
North Charleston, South Carolina
College basketball tournaments in South Carolina